Giovanni Argoli (1 July 1609 – 1660) was an Italian scholar and poet.

Biography 
Giovanni was the son of a well-known mathematician, Andrea Argoli, and was born at Tagliacozzo in the Abruzzi. At the age of fifteen he published a poem on the silkworm, Bombace e Seta (Rome, 1624). Two years later, emulous of the reputation Marino had just gained with his Adone, the young Argoli is said to have shut himself in an apartment, where he was visited only by servants bringing his food, and in seven months, at the age of seventeen, produced his Endimione (Rome, 1626). It met with a success apparently at least equal to the author's hopes. In 1632 he followed his father to Padua (where the latter was professor of mathematics), taking the doctorate in law. Yet he returned to literature, which he taught with success at Bologna until about 1640. Thereafter he again turned to the law, and held office in the government of Cervia and Lugo. In addition to his Italian verse, Argoli produced a number of poems in Latin, and several works on archaeology and philology. Among these last are notes on the De Ludis Circensibus of Onofrio Panvinio (Padua 1642). Giovanni Argoli was a member of the Umoristi, Gelati, and Incogniti academies.

Works 
 
 
 
  
 Reprinted in: Johann Georg Graevius (ed.), Thesaurus antiquitatum romanarum, IX, Leida, Petrus van der Aa, 1699. (Online)
 
 Epistola ad Jacobum Philippum Tomasinum de templo Dianae Nemorensis, in: Giacomo Filippo Tomasini, De donariis ac tabellis votivis liber singularis, Padova, 1654 in-4 pag. 13 ff.; reprinted in:

Bibliography 

 «Giovanni Argoli figlio d'Andrea». In : Le glorie de gli Incogniti: o vero, Gli huomini illustri dell'Accademia de' signori Incogniti di Venetia, In Venetia : appresso Francesco Valuasense stampator dell'Accademia, 1647, pp. 192–195 (on-line).
 
 
 
 
 

 
 
 On his relations with Leone da Modena see Roth, Cecil, “Leone da Modena and the Christian Hebraist of his Age,” Jewish Studies in Memory of Israel Abrahams (New York 1927), pp. 397 ff.
  

Italian archaeologists
Italian antiquarians
Italian poets
1609 births
Baroque writers
University of Padua alumni
Academic staff of the University of Bologna